Rudy Gollomb was a player in the National Football League for the Philadelphia Eagles in 1936 as a guard. He played at the collegiate level at Carroll University and the University of Wisconsin–Madison.

Biography
Gollomb was born Rudolph Peter Gollomb on November 6, 1911 in Oshkosh, Wisconsin. He died September 11, 1991.

See also
List of Philadelphia Eagles players

References

Philadelphia Eagles players
Sportspeople from Oshkosh, Wisconsin
Carroll University alumni
Wisconsin Badgers football players
Players of American football from Wisconsin
1911 births
1991 deaths